Events in the year 1980 in Norway.

Incumbents
 Monarch – Olav V
 Prime Minister – Odvar Nordli (Labour Party)

Events

Ongoing – The Alta controversy, a series of massive protests in the late 1970s and early 1980s concerning the construction of a hydroelectric power plant in Altaelva
 27 March – The Norwegian oil platform Alexander L. Kielland collapses in the North Sea, killing 123 of its crew of 212.
1 June – The Oslo Tunnel opened
 1 November – Population Census: 4,091,132 inhabitants in Norway.
 Røros is designated by UNESCO as a World Heritage Site.

Popular culture

Sports

Music 

19 April – Norway was represented by Sverre Kjelsberg and Mattis Hætta, with the song '"Sámiid Ædnan", at the 1980 Eurovision Song Contest.
The pop duo Dollie de Luxe established, consisting of Benedicte Adrian and Ingrid Bjørnov
The band Vazelina Bilopphøggers was established in Gjøvik

Film

Literature
Humlehjertene, novel by Ola Bauer

Notable births

21 January – Alexander Os, biathlete
28 January – Hallgrim Hansegård, choreographer and dancer
29 January – Øyvind Svenning, footballer
6 February – Frank Løke, handball player
12 February – Tine Rustad Kristiansen, handball player
12 February – Maya Vik, singer, songwriter, and bass player
22 February – Maria-Karine Aasen-Svensrud, politician.
28 February – Sigurd Pettersen, ski jumper
29 February – John Anders Gaustad, cross-country skier
2 March – Ingrid Bolsø Berdal, actress, singer, and film producer
5 March – Marianne Riddervold, orienteering competitor
10 March – Lars Horntveth, musician
13 March – Kristian Solem, artistic gymnast
21 March – Marit Bjørgen, cross-country skier
24 March – Anette Hovind Johansen, handball player
25 March – Kathrine Sørland, model
30 March – Katrine Lunde, handball player.
30 March – Kristine Lunde-Borgersen, handball player.
1 April – Vebjørn Berg, sports shooter
2 April – Thor Erik Forsberg, politician
2 April – Lubna Jaffery, politician
5 April – Glenn Andersen, footballer
10 April – Odd Borgersen, speed skater
10 April – Reidar Borgersen, cyclist
10 April – Ingrid Hjelmseth, footballer
12 April – Espen Harald Bjerke, cross-country skier
20 April – Ole Magnus Ekelund, handball player
22 April – Kari-Anne Henriksen, handball player
5 May – Stian Omenås, jazz musician
10 May – Karoline Dyhre Breivang, handball player
10 May – Espen Bugge Pettersen, footballer
14 May – Morten Ask, ice hockey player
14 May – Leif Erlend Johannessen, chess player
14 May – Anders Tyvand, politician
20 May – Marianne Paulsen, footballer
2 June – Ane Stangeland Horpestad, footballer
5 June – Helge André Njåstad, politician
8 June – Margret Hagerup, politician 
16 June – Tommy Urhaug, tennis player
16 June – Kadra Yusuf, Somali-Norwegian activist
17 June – Stian Aker, polar explorer
28 June – Rolf Jarle Brøske, politician
4 July – Rune Bolseth, footballer
11 July – Jenny Hval, singer, composer, lyricist and writer
24 July – Hans Åge Yndestad, footballer
30 July – Pa Modou Kah, footballer
5 August – Morten Solem, ski jumper
16 August – Øystein Moen, jazz pianist and composer
17 August – Lene Marlin, singer
19 August – Askil Holm, singer and musician
20 August – Per Steinar Osmundnes, politician
25 August – Pål Hausken, jazz musician
25 August – Marianne Marthinsen, politician
29 August – Tom Reidar Haraldsen, footballer
3 September – Jørgen Munkeby, jazz and heavy metal musician 
8 September – Kristian Kjelling, handball player
9 September – Ragnhild Aamodt, handball player
10 September – Roy Steffensen, politician
14 September – Odd-Magnus Williamson, copywriter, comedian and actor
24 September – John Arne Riise, footballer
25 September – Christina Bjordal, jazz singer
13 October – Kristian Gislefoss, meteorologist and weather presenter
13 October – Magne Hoseth, footballer
14 October – Ingvild Ryggen Carstens, ski mountaineer and heptathlete
16 October – Ingrid Baltzersen, politician
16 October – Erik A. Schjerven, actor
17 October – Siri Wålberg, musical artist
28 October – Hans Bollandsås, blues musician
31 October – Anders Bastiansen, ice hockey player
6 November – Pål Sverre Valheim Hagen, actor
17 November – Geir Ludvig Fevang, footballer
21 November – Olav Magne Dønnem, ski jumper
22 November – Thomas Solvoll, footballer
11 November – Helene Rask, model
4 December – Dag Inge Ulstein, politician.
10 December – Jon Midttun Lie, footballer
11 December – Marit Fiane Grødum, footballer
16 December – Øyvind Heian, politician
28 December – Andreas Amundsen, jazz musician

Full date missing
Anton Eger, jazz drummer

Notable deaths
 
 
3 January – Harald Heide Steen, actor (b.1911)
5 January – Olav Berkaak, novelist (born 1915).
4 January – Axel Henry Hansen, gymnast (b.1887)
8 January – Tryggve Gran, aviator, explorer and author (b.1889)

1 February – Henry Reinholt, footballer (born 1890).
2 February – Sigurd Lersbryggen, politician (b.1901)
12 February – Jørgen Stubberud, polar explorer (b.1883)
16 February – Knut Olaf Andreasson Strand, politician (b.1887)

1 March – Art Jorgens, baseball player in America (b.1905)
17 March – Hans Nikolai Stavrand, politician (b.1894)
29 March – Einar Nilsen, boxer (b.1901)

9 April – Finn Halse, writer (born 1910).
11 April – Einar Østvedt, historian and educator (born 1903).
12 April – Sonja Wigert, actress (born 1913)

9 May – Rolf Hansen, long-distance runner (b.1906)
9 May Øivind Lorentzen, ship-owner (born 1881)
11 May – Dyre Vaa, sculptor and painter (born 1903).
17 May – Thore Michelsen, rower (b.1888)
27 May – Halfdan Olaus Christophersen, historian (born 1902).

1 June – Ingvald Svinsås-Lo, politician (b.1897)

9 July – Synnøve Lie, speed skater (b.1908)
14 July – Kristian Kristiansen, author (b.1909)
21 July – Dakky Kiær, politician and feminist (born 1892)
22 July – Gunvor Katharina Eker, politician (b.1906)

13 August – Kolbjørn Varmann, priest and politician (born 1904)
15 August – Hans Berg, politician (b.1902)
19 August – Hans Offerdal, politician (b.1909)

2 October – Anders Kristian Orvin, geologist and explorer (b. 1889)
5 October – Tor Oftedal, politician (b.1925)
19 October – Torger Hovi, politician (b.1905)
19 October – Wilhelm Bøe, organizational leader (born 1915).

9 November – Claudia Olsen, politician (b.1896)
18 November – Knut Toven, politician (b.1897)
30 November – Ingrid Bjerkås, first female minister in the Church of Norway (b.1901)

8 December – Sverre Bergh, composer and pianist (born 1915).
25 December – Olav Dalgard, filmmaker and literature and art historian (b.1898)

Full date unknown
Sigval Bergesen the Younger, shipping magnate and industrialist (b.1893)
Gunnar Bråthen, politician (b.1896)
Hilmar Reksten, shipping magnate (b.1897)
Øistein Strømnæs, intelligence officer (b.1914)
Jens Tangen, trade unionist (born 1897)
Kristian Vilhelm Koren Schjelderup, Jr., theologian, author and bishop (b.1894)

References

External links

Norway, 1980 In